Rosemary Anne Crowley  (born 30 July 1938) is a former Australian politician. She served as a Senator for South Australia from 1983 to 2002, representing the Australian Labor Party (ALP). In the Keating Government she held ministerial office as Minister for Family Services (1993–1996) and Minister Assisting the Prime Minister for the Status of Women (1993).

Early life and education
Crowley was born in Melbourne and educated at Kilmaire Brigidine Convent. She graduated from the University of Melbourne in 1961 with a Bachelor of Medicine/Bachelor of Surgery.

Career
She then practiced as a doctor for several years at the Clovelly Park Community Health Centre in South Australia. She was a tutor at Flinders University, and lectured at the Mothers and Babies Health Association. Crowley was a founding member of the SA Mental Health Tribunal in 1973.

Crowley joined the Australian Labor Party in 1974 as the president of the Mitcham branch, and later of the Unley branch. She was also a member of the ALP's Women's Policy Committee from 1979 to 1983 and the SA Health Platform Committee from 1981 to 1983. Crowley entered the Senate in 1983, the first woman from the Australian Labor Party in South Australia to do so. During her term in the Senate, she held two ministerial positions: Minister for Family Services from 24 March 1993 to 11 March 1996, and Minister Assisting the Prime Minister for the Status of Women from 24 March to 23 December 1993. The former was a junior ministry within the Department of Health, Housing, Local Government and Community Services.

Crowley was passionate about health care, and contributed to Medicare reforms, as well as other legislation pertaining to child care, women and children, and sexual discrimination. After conducting an enquiry into Women, Sport, and the Media, Crowley made progress in improving funding and recognition for women's sport, which was always less of a priority than men's sport. This led to the establishment of the Prime Minister's Cup for Netball and the South Australian Premier's Cup for Women's Sport.

Crowley retired from politics at the end of her term in 2002.

Personal life
Crowley resides in Adelaide, and has three adult sons. She enjoys theatre and gardening, and is the Patron of the Handknitters Guild of South Australia.

Awards and honours
At the 2015 Australia Day Honours, Crowley was appointed an Officer of the Order of Australia for distinguished service to the Parliament of Australia as a Minister in the Commonwealth Government and Senator representing the people of South Australia, and as an advocate for promoting the status of women.

References

External links
Rosemary Crowley Archival Collection at the Bob Hawke Prime Ministerial Library
Rosemary Crowley, Senate Biography

1938 births
Living people
Australian Labor Party members of the Parliament of Australia
Australian women medical doctors
Australian medical doctors
Women government ministers of Australia
Medical doctors from Melbourne
Members of the Australian Senate
Members of the Australian Senate for South Australia
Officers of the Order of Australia
University of Melbourne alumni
University of Melbourne women
Women members of the Australian Senate
21st-century Australian politicians
21st-century Australian women politicians
20th-century Australian politicians
Government ministers of Australia
20th-century Australian women politicians